Gateway Town Center (commonly called Gateway Mall or Gateway) is an indoor/outdoor shopping center located in the Jacksonville, Florida neighborhood of Brentwood, just off Interstate 95 (exit 355 and 356) at Golfair Boulevard and Norwood Avenue. Developed in the 1950s, it has over 70 stores, and is anchored by Publix.

The mall originally consisted of a strip center with Food Fair, G. C. Murphy, J. C. Penney, Winn Dixie, and W. T. Grant (later May-Cohen's). A 1967 expansion added the enclosed mall, anchored by a new J. C. Penney store and Jefferson Ward, later Zayre.

Notes and references

External links
Gateway Town Center website

Buildings and structures in Jacksonville, Florida
Shopping malls in Florida
Shopping malls established in 1959
Economy of Jacksonville, Florida
Tourist attractions in Jacksonville, Florida
Northside, Jacksonville
1959 establishments in Florida